There have been two baronetcies created for persons with the surname Hunt, one in the Baronetage of Ireland and one in the Baronetage of the United Kingdom. Both creations are extinct.

The Hunt, later de Vere Baronetcy, of Curragh in the County of Limerick, was created in the Baronetage of Ireland on 4 December 1784. For more information on this creation, see De Vere baronets.

The Hunt Baronetcy, of Cromwell Road in the parish of Saint Mary Abbots, Kensington, in the County of London, was created in the Baronetage of the United Kingdom on 13 October 1892 for the distiller and Conservative politician Frederick Seager Hunt. The title became extinct on his death in 1904.

Hunt, later de Vere baronets, of Curragh (1784)
see De Vere baronets

Hunt Baronets, of Cromwell Road (1892)
Sir Frederick Seager Hunt, 1st Baronet (1838–1904)

References

Extinct baronetcies in the Baronetage of Ireland
Extinct baronetcies in the Baronetage of the United Kingdom